The knockout stage of the 2018 FIFA World Cup was the second and final stage of the competition, following the group stage. It began on 30 June with the round of 16 and ended on 15 July with the final match, held at the Luzhniki Stadium in Moscow. The top two teams from each group (16 in total) advanced to the knockout stage to compete in a single-elimination style tournament. A third place play-off was also played between the two losing teams of the semi-finals.

France won the final 4–2 against Croatia for their second title, while Belgium won the third place play-off 2–0 over England.

All times listed are local time.

Format
In the knockout stage, if a match was level at the end of 90 minutes of normal playing time, extra time was played (two periods of 15 minutes each), where each team was allowed to make a fourth substitution. If still tied after extra time, the match was decided by a penalty shoot-out to determine the winners.

Qualified teams
The top two placed teams from each of the eight groups qualified for the knockout stage.

Bracket

Round of 16

France vs Argentina

The teams had faced each other in 11 previous matches, including two World Cup group stage matches, both won by Argentina (1–0 in 1930, and 2–1 in 1978).

After nine minutes, Antoine Griezmann's 25-yard free-kick crashed back off Franco Armani's crossbar. After picking the ball up deep inside his own half, Kylian Mbappé set off on a run that was halted when Marcos Rojo hauled him down just inside the area. Griezmann stepped up and converted from the spot, sending the ball low to Armani's right. Four minutes before the interval, Ángel Di María shot from distance with his left foot to beat Hugo Lloris into the top right corner of the net. Three minutes after the restart, Éver Banega's free-kick was headed out towards Lionel Messi whose effort towards goal from the right was diverted past Lloris by Gabriel Mercado with his left leg. Nine minutes later, Lucas Hernandez's cross from the left found Benjamin Pavard, who shot a half-volley from outside the area, sending it into Armani's top-right corner. Mbappé put France ahead again in the 64th minute when he picked up a loose ball in the left of the area, found a yard of space and fired in low with his left foot under Armani. His second – a first-time low finish from the right of the penalty area with his right foot – followed just four minutes later. Sergio Agüero nodded home in the third minute of stoppage time from a Messi cross from the right. Argentina had a final chance to score, but the ball was deflected, dumping them out of the World Cup. This game was hailed as "one of the greatest World Cup games of all time" by The Independent.

With this match, Didier Deschamps became the longest-serving coach in the history of the France national team with his 80th game in charge of France, moving ahead of his predecessor Raymond Domenech. Mbappé became the first teenager to score at least twice in a World Cup tournament since Michael Owen in 1998, and the first teenager to score at least twice in a single World Cup match since Pelé netted twice for Brazil against Sweden in the 1958 final. Argentina became the first team to score at least three goals but still lose a World Cup match since the Soviet Union vs Belgium in 1986. Pavard's strike was later voted as goal of the tournament.

Uruguay vs Portugal

The teams had met in two previous matches, most recently in Brazil Independence Cup in 1972, the match ending in a 1–1 draw.

In the seventh minute, Edinson Cavani switched play from right to left with a sweeping pass out to Luis Suárez, who delivered a cross which the former crashed home at the back post from six yards out. In the 55th minute, Raphaël Guerreiro delivered a cross from a short corner on the left, which Pepe finished with a downward header. Just seven minutes later, Rodrigo Bentancur collected the ball around 30 yards out and slipped a pass out to Cavani on the left side of the penalty area, Cavani then shot a curling right-foot strike into the right corner of the net to reclaim the lead for Uruguay. Bernardo Silva shot off-target with the goal gaping after Fernando Muslera's mistake, with Cavani seeming to pick up an injury in the scramble.

Pepe, aged 35 years and 124 days, became Portugal's oldest goal-scorer at a FIFA World Cup. This was the first time Uruguay won their opening four games at a World Cup tournament since 1930, with the fourth game in that run being their 4–2 victory over Argentina in the final.

Spain vs Russia

The teams had met in six previous games, most recently in a friendly in 2017, which ended in a 3–3 draw. Playing as the Soviet Union, the teams had faced each other five times. Russia only had one victory over Spain.

In the 12th minute, Marco Asensio's free-kick from deep on the right saw Sergei Ignashevich grappling with Sergio Ramos at the back post, the ball bouncing past Igor Akinfeev off the defender's heel. Russia were then awarded a penalty when Gerard Piqué handled in the box after a corner from the right. Artem Dzyuba shot home to the right of the net from 12 yards to send the sides into half-time level. In the 85th minute, Akinfeev got down low to his right to save a shot from Andrés Iniesta, the goalkeeper then denied Iago Aspas on the rebound. Piqué and Ramos both appeared to be held from a set-piece but, after a VAR check, the referee waved away Spain's appeals. In the penalty shoot-out, Akinfeev kept out a Koke effort and saw Aspas' effort diverted away by his leg to give Russia the win; as all Russia's penalty kicks ended up successful.

This result meant Spain lost three of their four World Cup penalty shoot-outs (after losing to Belgium in 1986, beating the Republic of Ireland in 2002 and losing to South Korea in 2002), and had still never defeated a host nation at the FIFA World Cup, after losing to Italy 0–1 in 1934, Brazil 1–6 in 1950, and South Korea after penalties in 2002. Russia reached the quarter-final of the World Cup for the first time since the break-up of the Soviet Union. Also was the first win of Russia in a knockout stage of World Cup since 1966, still like Soviet Union. Ignashevich became the oldest player to score an own goal at the World Cup, aged 38 years and 352 days. The match marked the first time in the history of the FIFA World Cup in which a fourth substitution was made during extra time, after Aleksandr Yerokhin of Russia entered the pitch in the 97th minute.

Croatia vs Denmark
The teams had met in five matches, which included two matches played in 1998 FIFA World Cup qualification, the first fixture ending in a 1–1 draw and the reverse fixture a 3–1 Denmark win.

In the first minute, a long throw into the Croatia penalty area by Jonas Knudsen, allowed a run to Thomas Delaney who touched the ball on to Mathias Jørgensen, who side-footed it into the net via deflections off goalkeeper Danijel Subašić and the post. After three minutes, Šime Vrsaljko's ball into the box reached Henrik Dalsgaard, whose clearance hit Andreas Christensen in the face and saw Mario Mandžukić tucking the ball between Kasper Schmeichel and the left post with a shot on the turn from six yards. During extra time, Ante Rebić burst clear of the Denmark defence and was felled by Mathias Jørgensen when he was clean through on goal, only for Schmeichel to save Luka Modrić's spot-kick by diving down to his left and clutching the ball to his chest. In the shoot-out, Subašić tipped off Christian Eriksen's penalty onto the post but Schmeichel saved from Milan Badelj to bring the sides level. Lasse Schöne's shot was saved by Subašić and Josip Pivarić was denied by an acrobatic Schmeichel stop. On the final spot kicks for both the teams, Nicolai Jørgensen took a shot from a staggered run-up which Subašić saved with his feet, before Ivan Rakitić slotted the ball into the bottom left corner of the net.

Croatia qualified for their first World Cup quarter-final since 1998.

Brazil vs Mexico
The teams had met in 40 previous matches including two games at CONCACAF Gold Cup finals (1996 and 2003, both won by Mexico), the 1999 FIFA Confederations Cup Final (won 4–3 by Mexico), and four times in the FIFA World Cup group stage, three won by Brazil and one ending in a draw (4–0 in 1950, 5–0 in 1954, 2–0 in 1962 and 0–0 in 2014).

Hirving Lozano's half-volley was well blocked by Miranda, while at the other end, Guillermo Ochoa saved Neymar's drive from just outside the penalty area. After 25 minutes, Neymar raced past Edson Álvarez in the area and forced Ochoa into a save with his left hand. Gabriel Jesus went close in the 33rd minute, finding space in a crowded area and drilling in a left-footed strike that Ochoa palmed away. In the 51st minute, Neymar's back-heel on the edge of the area teed up Willian for a burst into the box and his scuffed cross from the left was slid into an empty net by Neymar from close range. With two minutes remaining, Neymar powered through on the left and his low effort was diverted by Ochoa's foot into the path of Roberto Firmino, who tapped the ball into an empty net from close range.

Since the introduction of the round of 16 in 1986, Mexico were eliminated at this stage of the World Cup seven times – more than twice as many as any other nation. This was also Mexico's fourth defeat at the hands of Brazil. In addition, with Neymar's and Firmino's goals, Brazil have now finally surpassed the record of all-time World Cup goals by any team with 228 goals (after being tied to Germany with 226 goals prior to this match) after constantly tying up the record with Germany in the group stage of this World Cup.

Belgium vs Japan

The teams had faced each other in 5 previous matches, including one World Cup group stage match in 2002, which ended in a 2–2 draw. Their most recent meeting came in a friendly in 2017, a 1–0 Belgium win and also Belgium's first victory over Japan.

In the 48th minute, Gaku Shibasaki slipped a pass through to Genki Haraguchi, who rifled a shot across Thibaut Courtois from the right which went into the left corner of the net. After 4 minutes, Japan scored a second, Shinji Kagawa collecting a loose ball and feeding Takashi Inui, the midfielder working himself a yard of space before arrowing home from 25-yards into the bottom right corner of the net. Jan Vertonghen's looping header from the left eluded goalkeeper Eiji Kawashima and landed in the right corner of the net after a corner caused chaos in the Japan penalty area – and five minutes later they were back on level terms. Eden Hazard twisted and turned to create space on the left wing, his cross delivered for Marouane Fellaini to climb above his marker and crash in a downward header. In the last minute of stoppage time, Courtois found Kevin De Bruyne with a long throw, who freed Thomas Meunier with a pass, Meunier squared a low cross from the right and, when Romelu Lukaku dummied the ball, substitute Nacer Chadli was on hand to complete the comeback for Belgium with a low finish.

Belgium became the first team to come from two or more goals down to win a World Cup knockout stage match within 90 minutes since Portugal beat North Korea in the 1966 quarter-final (3–0 down, 5–3 win). Japan scored six goals at Russia 2018, their highest ever tally in a single World Cup tournament. Belgium reached the World Cup quarter-finals in successive tournaments for the first time.

Sweden vs Switzerland

The teams had faced each other in 28 previous matches, which included three matches in 1962 FIFA World Cup qualification, Switzerland winning twice (3–2 and 2–1) and Sweden winning once (4–0), and also twice in 1978 FIFA World Cup qualification, both matches ending in a 2–1 Sweden win.

Stephan Lichtsteiner and Fabian Schär were both ruled out through suspension. Albin Ekdal's volley missed the target prior to the break from a Mikael Lustig cross. Ola Toivonen fired over when well positioned inside the penalty area before Emil Forsberg finally broke the deadlock, his right foot shot from just outside the penalty area clipping Manuel Akanji to beat Yann Sommer. Switzerland sent on forwards Breel Embolo and Haris Seferovic, and the latter tested Sweden goalkeeper Robin Olsen with a header in the closing stages. Sweden were denied the chance to double their lead from the spot following Michael Lang's late dismissal for taking out Martin Olsson, with Sommer beating away Toivonen's driven free-kick after a lengthy delay.

Sweden qualified for their first World Cup quarter-final since 1994. Sweden won back-to-back World Cup matches for the first time since 1958, when they won the quarter-final and semi-final on their way to the final as host nation that year. Olsen kept his third clean sheet of the 2018 World Cup, a joint-record for a Swedish goalkeeper in World Cup finals history (also three clean sheets for Ronnie Hellström in 1974 and Kalle Svensson in 1958).

Colombia vs England

The teams had faced each other in five previous matches, including one World Cup group stage match in 1998, a 2–0 England win. Their most recent meeting came in a friendly in 2005, a 3–2 England win.

In the 16th minute, Harry Kane arrived beyond the back post to meet a Kieran Trippier cross, but was unable to direct his header on target. Wilmar Barrios was booked when he appeared to headbutt Jordan Henderson in the build-up to a free-kick Trippier bent narrowly wide. Colombia gave away a penalty early in the second half when Carlos Sánchez dragged Kane down in the box after a corner from the right. Kane scored from 12 yards, shooting down the middle to give England the lead. Colombia forced their way into extra time, Yerry Mina scoring a downward header from a Juan Cuadrado corner from the right in injury time. Eric Dier scored the final penalty in the shoot-out, with England coming back from 3–2 down after Mateus Uribe and Carlos Bacca failed to convert their spot-kicks.

This was the first time that England had won a penalty shoot-out at the FIFA World Cup, and only the second time they had won on penalties at any major tournament (the previous occasion being against Spain at Euro 1996). Kane became the first player to score in six consecutive England appearances since Tommy Lawton did so in 1939. England conceded in injury time at the end of the second half for the first time in World Cup history, with Mina's goal coming after 92 minutes and 33 seconds.

Quarter-finals

Uruguay vs France
The teams had met in eight previous matches including three times in the FIFA World Cup group stage, one won by Uruguay and the other two ending in a draw (2–1 in 1966, 0–0 in 2002 and 0–0 in 2010).

In the 15th minute, after latching on to Olivier Giroud's knockdown in the box, Kylian Mbappé headed the ball over Fernando Muslera's crossbar. Five minutes before the break, Antoine Griezmann's inswinging free kick from the right was met by Raphaël Varane, who headed the ball into the bottom left corner. Four minutes later, Martín Cáceres' header was saved by Hugo Lloris low to his right and Diego Godín shot the rebound over. In the 61st minute, Griezmann's left footed shot from outside the penalty area slipped through Muslera's hands and into the net as France doubled their lead. Mbappé went down softly under a challenge from Cristian Rodríguez, prompting angry confrontations involving Godín, Nahitan Nández and Paul Pogba. In the 73rd minute, Corentin Tolisso's shot curled over, while Griezmann also flashed a late free-kick over the top.

France became only the second team to beat three different South American sides in a single World Cup tournament, after the Netherlands in 1974. This victory marked France's 10th game unbeaten in World Cup matches against South American sides (6 wins and 4 draws), since a 2–1 loss against Argentina in 1978 – the joint longest run alongside Italy (1982 to 2010).

Brazil vs Belgium

The teams had met in four previous matches, including once in a World Cup knockout stage match in 2002 with Brazil winning 2–0 to advance to the quarter-finals, which was the last time the two sides had previously met.

Belgium scored from their first corner of the game in the 13th minute; Vincent Kompany flicked on Nacer Chadli's delivery, but the decisive touch came from Fernandinho, who turned the ball past Alisson via his arm. Belgium doubled their lead by breaking from a Brazil corner in the 31st minute, with Kevin De Bruyne arrowing a right foot drive across Alisson and into the left corner of the net from the edge of the penalty area after Romelu Lukaku collected the ball, turned and embarked on a 40-yard run with a pass at the end to free De Bruyne. Brazil's third change yielded a goal three minutes and 14 seconds after his introduction, Renato Augusto gliding between two Belgium defenders to nod a flicked header past Thibaut Courtois from a Philippe Coutinho cross. Coutinho's first-time shot flew wide and yet another Neymar penalty appeal was rejected, before he drew a fingertip save from Courtois in the 94th minute.

De Bruyne became the 100th player to score at the 2018 World Cup (excluding own goals). Belgium reached the World Cup semi-finals for only the second time, with them losing out to eventual winners Argentina in 1986. Belgium's victory was only their second ever against Brazil, and first since a 1963 friendly match in Brussels. This was the first time in 30 matches in all competitions that Brazil had conceded more than once in a game, since a 2–2 draw with Paraguay in March 2016. Despite Brazil's loss, with Renato Augusto's goal, Brazil have now topped the all-time record of World Cup goals by any team with a total of 229 goals.

Sweden vs England
The teams had faced each other in 23 previous matches, including two times in the group stage of the World Cup, both matches ending in a draw (1–1 in 2002 and 2–2 in 2006). Their most recent meeting came in a friendly in 2012, a 4–2 Sweden win.

England took the lead in the 30th minute, Ashley Young's outswinging corner from the left finding Harry Maguire, goalkeeper Robin Olsen and Ola Toivonen on the line unable to stop the defender's downward header. Olsen did well with a strong hand to deny Raheem Sterling, who dallied with the rebound and allowed Andreas Granqvist to make a vital block. Shortly after the restart, Jordan Pickford dived to his left to palm away a header from Marcus Berg, who climbed above Young at the back post. In the 58th minute, another England set-piece caused chaos and, although Sweden initially cleared their lines when Jesse Lingard delivered a cross from the right to the back post, Dele Alli was there to double his side's advantage with a header. John Guidetti teed up strike partner Berg in the 71st minute, but Pickford tipped the effort over the crossbar.

Alli's goal was England's 11th at the 2018 World Cup, equalling the country's record of most goals at a single World Cup set in 1966. Alli became the second youngest player to score for England at the World Cup (22 years and 87 days), behind only Michael Owen (18 years and 190 days against Romania in 1998). Maguire became the first defender to score the opening England goal in a World Cup knockout match since Rio Ferdinand in 2002 against Denmark. Pickford made three saves in the match and became the youngest England goalkeeper to keep a clean sheet in a World Cup match (24 years and 122 days). England qualified for their first World Cup semi-final since 1990.

Russia vs Croatia

The teams had faced each other in three previous matches. Their most recent meeting came in a friendly in 2015, a 3–1 Croatia win.

In the 31st minute, Denis Cheryshev came in from the left and, after a one-two with Artem Dzyuba, skipped away from Luka Modrić to curl a left foot effort beyond Danijel Subašić and into the left of the net. Six minutes before half-time, Mario Mandžukić advanced down the left to set up the chance for Andrej Kramarić to head home the equaliser. In the first period of extra time, Croatia took the lead as Domagoj Vida nodded down past Igor Akinfeev and into the right corner of the net after a corner from the right. Mário Fernandes drew his team level, converting Alan Dzagoev's free-kick with a glancing header to the left corner of the net after a free-kick from the right. Penalties were required and while Fyodor Smolov's Panenka attempt with the first effort was foiled by Subašić, parity was restored when Akinfeev got down to his left to keep out Mateo Kovačić's second kick for Croatia. After Fernandes' failure, Modrić's strike found the net, following touches off Akinfeev's glove and the post. The decisive penalty fell to Ivan Rakitić, who rolled the ball into the bottom-left corner to give Croatia the win.

Russia became the first country in World Cup history to contest two shoot-outs while hosting the event. There were three headed goals in this match – the most in a World Cup match since Germany's 8–0 win over Saudi Arabia in 2002 (5 headers). Croatia became the second team to win two penalty shootouts at a single World Cup tournament – the other was Argentina in 1990 (against Yugoslavia and Italy). Croatia qualified for the semi-final for the first time since 1998 (their first World Cup tournament).

Semi-finals
For the first time since 1966, all multiple World Cup winners were eliminated before the semi-final stage. This was only the second time that neither Brazil nor Germany were in the last four, the other being the inaugural 1930 tournament. With Uruguay and Brazil eliminated in the quarter-finals, an all-European semi-final line up was completed for the fifth time (after the 1934, 1966, 1982, and 2006 tournaments). This also ensured that a European side would win the World Cup for the fourth tournament in a row.

France vs Belgium
The teams had faced each other in 73 previous matches, including two times in the World Cup, France winning both matches (3–1 in the round of 16 in 1938 and 4–2 in the third place play-off in 1986). Their most recent meeting came in a friendly in 2015, a 4–3 Belgium win.

Eden Hazard twice went close, narrowly missing the target with a low, left-footed drive before seeing a curler with his right deflected over the crossbar by the head of Raphaël Varane. Hugo Lloris' full-length dive kept out a first-time strike on the turn from Toby Alderweireld, while Thibaut Courtois blocked Benjamin Pavard's attempt from a tight angle on the right at the other end. Six minutes after the break, Vincent Kompany's block turned away Olivier Giroud's shot, and Antoine Griezmann's inswinging delivery from the right to the front post was turned in by Samuel Umtiti, who outjumped his marker, Marouane Fellaini, to head beyond Courtois. Dries Mertens's cross from the right flank saw Fellaini narrowly miss the target with a header. Axel Witsel's long-range drive was pushed away by Lloris as France secured their place into the final.

With this match, it meant Didier Deschamps managed more games for France at the World Cup than any other previous France manager, overtaking Raymond Domenech and Michel Hidalgo. This was Belgium's first defeat of any kind since a friendly loss against Spain in September 2016. France reached their third World Cup final, also doing so in 1998 and 2006. Only Germany (8) and Italy (6) had reached more among European nations.

Croatia vs England

The teams had faced each other in seven previous matches, which included two matches played in the 2010 FIFA World Cup qualification, England winning on both occasions (4–1 and 5–1).

Luka Modrić stopped a Dele Alli run, by fouling him at the edge of the area. Kieran Trippier found the top right corner of the net from the resulting free kick with his right foot. Harry Kane nearly doubled England's lead, but his close range shot deflected off Danijel Subašić's foot and onto the post. After half-time, Ivan Perišić met Šime Vrsaljko's deep cross from the right at head height with a flying, left-footed finish to the left of the net. Soon after, Perišić shot against the right-hand post from the left before Ante Rebić put the rebound into Jordan Pickford's hands. In extra-time, John Stones had a header cleared off the line by Vrsaljko in the 98th minute. Pickford at the other end, denied Mario Mandžukić at point-blank range after the striker met Perišić's cross from the left. But Mandžukić came out on top soon after the break, latching on to Perišić's headed pass on the left and sending a left-footed effort across Pickford to find the bottom-right corner, securing Croatia's entrance into their first ever World Cup final.
 
Croatia became the first team to avoid defeat after trailing in three knockout matches at a single World Cup. They became the 13th different nation to reach a World Cup final. Trippier became the first player to score a direct free-kick for England at the World Cup since David Beckham in 2006 against Ecuador. Trippier's goal after four minutes and 44 seconds was the fastest goal scored in a World Cup semi-final since 1958 (Vavá after two minutes for Brazil v France) and was England's 12th goal in Russia, their most in a single World Cup. Croatia became the first team to play extra time in three consecutive World Cup matches since England in 1990. England scored nine goals from set-pieces at the 2018 World Cup – the most by a team in a single World Cup tournament since 1966.

Third place play-off
Belgium and England had previously met in 22 matches, including three matches at the World Cup, one round of 16 game at the 1990 FIFA World Cup which ended in a 1–0 victory for England, one group stage game at the 1954 FIFA World Cup which ended in a 4–4 draw and their most recent encounter in Group G of this tournament which Belgium won 1–0. As both were European teams, this was already set pre-match as the 10th consecutive World Cup in which European teams finished third, stretching back to 1982.

After four minutes, Thomas Meunier raced into the box to get across Danny Rose and tucked home Nacer Chadli's low cross in from the left from six yards out. Harry Kane scuffed wide of the left post, from a Raheem Sterling lay-off. In the 70th minute, Eric Dier burst through for a one-on-one and dinked over Thibaut Courtois, only to see a retreating Toby Alderweireld hack the ball off the line. Jordan Pickford made a one-handed save to deny Meunier in the 80th minute. Eden Hazard scored the second with a near-post finish with his right foot, having been sent clean through by Kevin De Bruyne.

Meunier was the 10th player to score for Belgium at the 2018 World Cup. No other team had more, equalling France in 1982 and Italy in 2006. This became Belgium's best finish at a World Cup, having previously finished fourth in 1986. This was England's 100th match at a major tournament – 69 at the World Cup and 31 at the European Championship. Since 1966, no player had been involved in more World Cup goals for Belgium than Hazard (seven – three goals and four assists), level with Jan Ceulemans (also four goals and three assists).

Final

The match was the sixth meeting between France and Croatia, with France undefeated in the previous fixtures with three wins and two draws. The two sides first met in the 1998 World Cup semi-final, with hosts France winning 2–1. Their only other competitive meeting was during the group stage of Euro 2004, which finished as a 2–2 draw. Their next and most recent meeting was in a March 2011 friendly match, which finished as a 0–0 draw.

See also
2022 FIFA World Cup knockout stage

References

External links
 

2018 FIFA World Cup
2018
Uruguay at the 2018 FIFA World Cup
Russia at the 2018 FIFA World Cup
Spain at the 2018 FIFA World Cup
Portugal at the 2018 FIFA World Cup
France at the 2018 FIFA World Cup
Denmark at the 2018 FIFA World Cup
Croatia at the 2018 FIFA World Cup
Argentina at the 2018 FIFA World Cup
Brazil at the 2018 FIFA World Cup
Switzerland at the 2018 FIFA World Cup
Sweden at the 2018 FIFA World Cup
Mexico at the 2018 FIFA World Cup
Belgium at the 2018 FIFA World Cup
England at the 2018 FIFA World Cup
Colombia at the 2018 FIFA World Cup
Japan at the 2018 FIFA World Cup